The following tables show state-by-state results in the Australian Senate at the 2013 Australian federal election.

Following a dispute of the results, the Western Australian results were declared void. The Western Australian senators were elected at the 2014 special election in Western Australia.

New senators took their places from 1 July 2014. This gave a Senate with the Coalition government on 33 seats, the Australian Labor Party opposition on 25 seats, and a record crossbench of 18: ten Australian Greens, three Palmer United, and single seats to David Leyonhjelm of the Liberal Democratic Party, Bob Day of the Family First Party, Ricky Muir of the Australian Motoring Enthusiast Party, John Madigan of the Democratic Labour Party and Nick Xenophon.



Australia 
This table includes votes and percentage from the 2013 election and the seat allocation is based on the void election in Western Australia. The 2014 Australian Senate special election in Western Australia includes the revised national totals after that election.

The Senate has 76 seats. Forty seats were up for election; six in each of the six states, two for the ACT and two for the Northern Territory. The terms of the four senators from the territories commenced on election day, all other terms take effect on 1 July 2014.

Distribution of preferences have occurred for all Senate seats in all states and territories. The Senate will see the Coalition government on 33 seats with the Labor opposition on 25 seats and a record crossbench of 18 – the Greens on ten seats, Palmer United on three seats, with other minor parties and independents on five seats – the LDP's David Leyonhjelm, Family First's Bob Day, and incumbents Nick Xenophon and the DLP's John Madigan. Muir indicated he would vote in line with Palmer United. The Coalition government will require the support of at least six non-coalition Senators to pass legislation.

Most Senate votes cast in Western Australia were subject to a formal recount. During the recount it was determined that  WA Senate ballot papers could not be located. After the final recount the result was duly declared which changed the last two predicted WA Senate spots from Palmer and Labor back to Sports and Green. Mick Keelty, a former AFP Commissioner, was requested by the AEC to investigate the issue of the misplaced ballot papers. On 15 November, the AEC petitioned the High Court, acting as the Court of Disputed Returns, to seek an order from the court that the WA Senate election of all six senators (3 Liberal, 1 Labor, 1 Green, 1 Sport) be declared void. The challenge was successful and a fresh half senate election was held in Western Australia. The outcome was that the Sport party's Wayne Dropulich was replaced by Zhenya Wang of the Palmer United Party.

A record number of candidates stood at the election. Group voting tickets came under scrutiny because multiple candidates were provisionally elected with the vast majority of their 14.3 percent quotas coming from the preferences of other parties across the political spectrum. "Preference whisperer" Glenn Druery organised tight cross-preferencing between many minor parties. Sports' Wayne Dropulich initially won a Senate seat on a record-low primary vote of 0.2 percent in Western Australia, his party placing coming 21st out of 28 groups on primary votes. Motoring's Ricky Muir won a senate seat on a record-low primary vote of 0.5 percent in Victoria. Previous examples of winning with low vote shares include Family First's Steve Fielding in 2004 on 1.9 percent in Victoria and the Nuclear Disarmament Party's Robert Wood in 1987 on 1.5 percent in New South Wales. Family First's Bob Day won a seat on a primary vote of 3.8 percent in South Australia, and the DLP's John Madigan won his seat in 2010 on a primary vote of 2.3 percent in Victoria. Xenophon and larger parties including the incoming government are looking at changes to the GVT system.

New South Wales

Victoria

Queensland

Western Australia

South Australia

Tasmania

Territories

Australian Capital Territory

Northern Territory

See also
 2013 Australian federal election
 Results of the 2013 Australian federal election (House of Representatives)
 Post-election pendulum for the 2013 Australian federal election
 Members of the Australian Senate, 2014–2016

Notes

References

2013 elections in Australia
Senate 2013
Australian Senate elections